Xerocrassa cretica is a species of air-breathing land snail, a pulmonate gastropod mollusk in the family Geomitridae.

Distribution

This species is native to Cyprus, Greece, Libya and Turkey.

References

 Westerlund, C. A. &. Blanc, H. (1879). Aperçu sur la faune malacologique de la Grèce inclus l'Epire et la Thessalie. Coquilles extramarines. 161 pp. + errata (1 pp.), pl. 1-4
 Bank, R. A.; Neubert, E. (2017). Checklist of the land and freshwater Gastropoda of Europe. Last update: July 16th, 201

External links

 Pfeiffer, L. (1841). Symbolae ad historiam Heliceorum. Sectio prima [vol. 1. Kassel: Th. Fischer. 88 pp]

cretica
Invertebrates of Cyprus
Molluscs of Europe
Invertebrates of North Africa
Invertebrates of Turkey
Gastropods described in 1841